The 2020–21 WPBL season was the 30th season of the Russian Women's Basketball Premier League. UMMC Ekaterinburg are the defending champions.

Regular season

Playoffs

Russian clubs in European competitions

References

External links
Official Website (in Russian)

202021
WPBL
Russia